The Maria family (adj. Marian; FIN: 506; also known as Roma family) is a collisional asteroid family located in the inner parts of the intermediate asteroid belt, near the 1:3 Kirkwood gap. The family consist of several thousand  stony S-type asteroids. It is named after its parent body and lowest numbered member, the asteroid 170 Maria. It is also known as the Roma family, named after its alternative parent body, 472 Roma.

The family was initially identified by Japanese astronomer Kiyotsugu Hirayama in 1918. Asteroids in this family typically have a semi-major axis between 2.52−2.62 AU, and an inclination of 12 to 17°.

Members 

The family consists of 2940 known members based on the HCM method. Its largest members are the asteroids 170 Maria and 472 Roma. A complete synthetic HCM-listing for all members can be obtained by using the Ferret Interactive Search.

Interlopers 

Although asteroid 695 Bella has orbital properties that make it a candidate for this family, the spectral properties of the object indicate it is most likely an interloper. Instead, it may have been spalled off from 6 Hebe, or its parent body.

References